AIB or aib may refer to:

Organisations

Banking
 Afghanistan International Bank
 Allied Irish Banks
 AIB Group (UK)
 Allied Irish Bank (GB)
 AIB (NI)

Broadcasting
 Association for International Broadcasting
 Atlanta Interfaith Broadcasters

Education
 ACLEDA Institute of Business
 Aeronautical Institute of Bangladesh
 AIB College of Business
 Australian Institute of Business
 The Art Institute of Boston
 The Arts Institute at Bournemouth, former name of The Arts University Bournemouth

Military
 Allied Intelligence Bureau
 Admiralty Interview Board

Professional
 Academy of International Business
 American Institute of Baking
 Australian Institute of Building

Other
 Accident Investigation Board (disambiguation), several organisations
 Accident Investigation Bureau, several organisations
 Accidents Investigation Branch, predecessor of the UK's Air Accidents Investigation Branch
 Accountant in Bankruptcy, Scotland
 American Institute of Bisexuality
 Anti-inflation Board, Canada
 Association of Issuing Bodies
 Ação Integralista Brasileira, a Brazilian fascist party during the 1930s

Comedy
 All India Bakchod

Linguistics
 Äynu language, based on its ISO language code, aib

Science and technology
 Authenticated Identity Body
 Add-in board, a printed circuit board that acts an accessory for another device
 2-Aminoisobutyric acid

See also
 AAIB (disambiguation)
 Amplified in breast 1, Nuclear receptor coactivator 3
 Anglo Irish Bank

pt:AIB